Franko Grgić (born 31 January 2003) is a Croatian competitive swimmer in freestyle. 

Grgić won the gold medal both in the 800 m freestyle and the 1500 m freestyle  event at the 2019 FINA World Junior Swimming Championships in Budapest, Hungary. With the time of 14:46.09 in World Junior Championship he is the fastest 16-year-old 1500m freestyle swimmer in history. He captured two gold medals in the 400 m freestyle and the 1500 m freestyle event at the 2019 European Youth Summer Olympic Festival (EYOF) in Baku, Azerbaijan.
In 2019 he was nominated for the Piotr Nurowski “Best European Young Athlete” Prize awarded by the European Olympic Committees, subsequently he was awarded second place. 
In the same year he was awarded the best young Croatian athlete by the famous Sportske novosti magazine.

References

External links
 Grgić at Croatian Swimming Federation 

Living people
2003 births
Sportspeople from Split, Croatia
Croatian male freestyle swimmers
Croatian male swimmers
21st-century Croatian people